Étienne Marie Victor Lamy (2 June 1845, in Cize, Jura – 9 January 1919) was a French author.  He was educated at the College Stanislas and became a doctor of law in 1870.  From 1871 to 1881 he was a deputy from his native department, Jura, and his earlier writings were political and historical.  In the House of Deputies he was a member of the Left, but he broke with his party and became a clerical reactionary, writing for the Gaulois and the Correspondant.  In 1905 he became a member of the Académie française (seat #21), and in 1913 he succeeded Thureau-Dangin as its perpetual secretary.  Among Lamy's works are:  
 Le tiers parti (1868)  
 L'Armée et la democratie (1889)  
 La France du Levant (1898)  
 Etudes sur le second empire (1895)  
 La femme de demain (1899)  
 an edition of the memoirs of Aimée de Coigny (1900)
 Témoins de jours passés (1909, 1913)  
 Au service des idées et des lettres (1909)  
 Quelques œuvres et quelques œuvriers (1910, 1913)

Notes

References

External links
 
 

1845 births
1919 deaths
People from Jura (department)
Members of the Académie Française
French political writers
Burials at Père Lachaise Cemetery
French male non-fiction writers